Pingshanwei station is an interchange station for Line 14 and Line 16 of the Shenzhen Metro. It is located in Pingshan District. Line 14 platforms is opened on 28 October 2022 and Line 16 platforms opened on 28 December 2022.

History
In July 2017, the National Development and Reform Commission of the People's Republic of China approved the Fourth Phase Construction Plan of Shenzhen Urban Rail Transit (2017-2022). Shenzhen Metro Line 14 and Shenzhen Metro Line 16 were approved for construction, of which Pingshanwei Station is a transfer station for two lines.

In December 2018, the station floor of Pingshanwei Station Line 16 entered the main structure construction stage.

On May 15, 2020, the diaphragm wall of the main enclosure structure of Pingshanwei Line 16 station floor was completed.

In May 2021, the main structure of the station floor of Line 14 and Line 16 of Pingshanwei Station will be capped.

On April 22, 2022, Shenzhen Municipal People's Government approved the Plan for Station Names of Relevant Lines of Shenzhen Rail Transit Phase IV, and the station was named 'Pingshanwei Station'. In September, Pingshanwei Station passed the fire acceptance. On October 28, Pingshanwei Station was put into operation with the opening of Shenzhen Metro Line 14 Phase I Project.

On October 28, 2022, the station was opened together with Shenzhen Metro Line 14.

On Devember 28, 2022, Line 16 station opened.

Station layout

Exits
Pingshanwei station has eight exits. Before Line 16 open, the station only open Exit A and Exit B.

Gallery

References

External links
 Shenzhen Metro Pingshanwei Station (Line 14) (Chinese)
 Shenzhen Metro Pingshanwei Station (Line 14) (English)

Railway stations in Guangdong
Shenzhen Metro stations
Railway stations in China opened in 2022